Holiday Wishes, also titled Christmas Wishes in the UK and Snow Wishes in Japan, is a Christmas holiday album by American singer-songwriter and actress Idina Menzel. Produced by Walter Afanasieff, it was released by Warner Bros. Records on October 14, 2014, in the United States, and on November 3 in the United Kingdom. It is Menzel's fourth studio album to date, as well as her first in six years, and features a duet with Michael Bublé.

Background
During her one night only concert at Radio City Music Hall, Menzel revealed details about the album, and indicated that the track "December Prayer" would be an original song. She also added, in regard to her Jewish ethnicity, "I know I'm Jewish. But a lot of famous Jewish people have written Christmas songs, so I'm going to try out some of their songs on the album."

Although it is the only song in the album that was written by Menzel, the song "December Prayer" is a cover of the Yvonne Catterfeld song. Catterfeld's original rendition was included on her 2010 album Blau im Blau.

Content and composition
According to Menzel, Holiday Wishes consists of mostly "songs that I've always wanted to sing." The album begins with a cover of the holiday standard "Do You Hear What I Hear?", the recording of which was inspired by American singer Whitney Houston's rendition. The fifth song is a cover of "All I Want for Christmas Is You", which was originally recorded and made famous by American singer Mariah Carey. Menzel opted to record the track using an arrangement that producer Walter Afanasieff, who co-wrote and produced Carey's version, had never been able to use before.

The seventh track "December Prayer" is the only original song featured on the album, which has been described by Randy Lewis of the Los Angeles Times as a "reflection about a soldier finding his way home for the holidays."

Reception

Holiday Wishes has garnered positive reviews from music critics. Stephen Thomas Erlewine of AllMusic concluded, "Unsurprising though it may be, Holiday Wishes nevertheless is satisfying because producer Walter Afanasieff commits to his Christmas classicism, as does Menzel. Everything here sparkles with the gleam of freshly fallen snow: it's big, bright, and so stubbornly out of fashion that it'd never go out of style." Praising Menzel's vocal performance, the Los Angeles Times' Randy Lewis wrote that the singer "brings a stocking-full of interpretive skill to some holiday classics." Lewis opined that despite "conventional" arrangements, "Menzel's tone and phrasing are consistently lovely."

Commercial performance
Upon its release, Holiday Wishes debuted at number 13 on the Billboard 200 albums chart with sales of 20,000 copies, making it the highest-charting solo album of her career. In its sixth week on the chart, the album sold 33,000 copies and reached a new peak of number 10, making it Menzel's first ever solo album to reach the top 10 on the Billboard 200. With sales of 370,000, Holiday Wishes was 2014's second best-selling holiday album, behind That's Christmas to Me by Pentatonix. On December 20, 2014, the album peaked at number 6 on the Billboard 200.

Track listing
All tracks produced by Walter Afanasieff, except "When You Wish upon a Star" produced by Rob Mounsey.

Personnel
Idina Menzel – lead vocals
Walter Afanasieff – production, arrangements, keyboards
Rob Mounsey – production
William Ross – arrangements
Jorge Calandrelli – arrangements
David Reitzas – mixing
Nathan East – bass guitar
Vinnie Colaiuta – drums
Paul Jackson Jr. – guitar
Dennis Budimir – guitar
Randy Waldman – piano
Kenny G – saxophone
Kent Smith – trumpet solo
Michael Bublé – vocal duet
Missi Hale – backing vocals
Luke Edgemon – backing vocals
Monét Owens – backing vocals
Tyler Gordon – engineering, programming
David Reitzas – engineering
Adrian Bradford – engineering
Tommy Vicari – orchestral engineering
Larry Mah – orchestral engineering
Courtney Blooding – production coordination
Norman Wonderly – creative direction
Ruven Afandor – photography

Charts

Weekly charts

Year-end charts

Certifications

Notes

References

2014 Christmas albums
Christmas albums by American artists
Pop Christmas albums
Idina Menzel albums
Albums produced by Walter Afanasieff

Albums recorded at Capitol Studios